The women's K-1 slalom canoeing event at the 2020 Summer Olympics took place on 25 and 27 July 2021 at the Kasai Canoe Slalom Course. 27 canoeists from 27 nations competed.

Background
This was the ninth appearance of the event, having previously appeared in every Summer Olympics with slalom canoeing: 1972 and 1992 to 2016.

Reigning Olympic champion Maialen Chourraut of Spain made her fourth Olympic appearance (she also took bronze in 2012), attempting to defend her title. Reigning World Champion Eva Terčelj of Slovenia also competed as a medal hopeful. She placed 13th in 2012.

Qualification

A National Olympic Committee (NOC) could enter only 1 qualified canoeist in the women's slalom K-1 event. A total of 24 qualification places were available, allocated as follows:

 1 place for the host nation, Japan
 18 places awarded through the 2019 ICF Canoe Slalom World Championships
 5 places awarded through continental tournaments, 1 per continent

Three additional athletes competed, having already earned a quota in the Women's C1 event.

Qualifying places were awarded to the NOC, not to the individual canoeist who earned the place.

The World Championships quota places were allocated as follows:

Continental and other places:

Notes
The quota for the Americas was allocated to the NOC with the highest-ranked eligible athlete, due to the cancellation of the 2021 Pan American Championships.

Competition format
Slalom canoeing uses a three-round format, with heats, semifinal, and final. In the heats, each canoeist had two runs at the course with the better time counting. The top 24 advanced to the semifinal. In the semifinal, the canoeists get a single run; the top 10 advanced to the final. The best time in the single-run final wins gold.

Penalty time was added for infractions such as passing on the wrong side or touching a gate. Runs typically lasted approximately 95 seconds.

Schedule
All times were Japan Standard Time (UTC+9)

The women's slalom K-1 took place over two separate days.

Results

References

Women's slalom K-1
Women's events at the 2020 Summer Olympics